The boys' kumite –61 kg competition at the 2018 Summer Youth Olympics was held on 17 October at the Europa Pavilion in Buenos Aires, Argentina.

Schedule
All times are local (UTC-3).

Results

Elimination round

Pool A

Pool B

Semifinals

Final

References

External links
Summary

Karate at the 2018 Summer Youth Olympics